Operation Unified Resolve is an air and ground operation to flush out and trap al-Qaeda fighters hiding in the eastern Afghanistan provinces.

Launched on 23 June 2003, Operation Unified Resolve is a joint operation between Pakistan, United States, and Afghanistan. Over 500 troops, mostly from the U.S. 82nd Airborne Division, began hunting the Taliban and al-Qaeda fighters in the provinces of Nangarhar and Kunar on Afghanistan's eastern border. The operation is especially focused on the city of Jalalabad, a known al-Qaeda stronghold strategically located on the main route between the Afghan capital Kabul and Pakistan city of Peshawar.

Anti-coalition forces, led by former Afghan prime minister Gulbuddin Hekmatyar, have attacked coalition forces with their usual retinue of rockets, mines, and bobby traps. Hekmatyar has been organizing alliances between the remaining anti-coalition forces in the area and increasing their coordination.

In addition to hunting the Taliban and al-Qaeda fighters, Operation Unified Resolve also distributes humanitarian assistance to the Afghan people in the nearby valleys.

Unified Resolve
History of Nangarhar Province
War in Afghanistan (2001–2021) detainees by facility